Haemadipsa picta (common names: tiger leech, or less commonly, stinging land leech) is a large (up to 33 mm long) terrestrial leech found in Borneo, Indochina, and Taiwan. It was described by John Percy Moore based on specimens collected from Sarawak, Borneo. It preys primarily on medium- to large-sized mammals, including humans.

Ecology and behavior
Haemadipsa picta occur on bushes and grasses about 1 metre or higher above the ground in moist forests. They are fast and actively moving, and even known to fall onto hikers from higher bushes or leaves. They attach themselves to the hands, arms, shoulders, and even neck of passers-by. The bites of this species are comparatively painful and difficult to heal, hence the common name "stinging land leech" (although Haemadipsa ornata, with a similarly painful bite, would deserve this name too).

Description
Haemadipsa picta measure  in length. It is easily recognized by its longitudinally striped reddish brown dorsum: there is a broad, bluish-gray, yellow-greenish, or multicolored median-paramedian field that contains three to five black or dark brown broken stripes inside. There is also a white or pale yellowish longitudinal marginal stripe with dark-spotted borders. The venter is uniformly yellowish brown.

References

External links
 
 

Leeches
Parasitic protostomes
Invertebrates of Malaysia
Invertebrates of Taiwan
Fauna of Vietnam
Animals described in 1929